Niña amada mía (English: My lovely girl) is a Mexican telenovela produced by Angelli Nesma for Televisa in 2003. It's an adaptation of the 1985 Venezuelan telenovela Las Amazonas.

On Monday, January 27, 2003, Canal de las Estrellas started broadcasting Niña amada mía weekdays at 8:00pm, replacing Así son ellas. The last episode was broadcast on Friday, June 27, 2003, with Velo de novia replacing it on Monday, June 30, 2003.

The series stars Karyme Lozano, Sergio Goyri, Mayrin Villanueva, Otto Sirgo, Ludwika Paleta and Julio Mannino.

Plot
Clemente Soriano prides himself on his wealth, power and family. He has three beautiful daughters, a young, beautiful wife, and loyal servants. He believes that his daughters, Isabela, Diana, and Carolina, only deserve the best. However, past the mask of a loving father lays the man who will do anything to gain what he wants. Even murder.

Octavio Uriarte and his mother Socorro have been the enemies of Clemente, since the birth of his first daughter. Both Uriartes are convinced that Clemente killed Octavio's brother, Servando, to gain possession of his ranch "La Noria" and his wife Isabella. But only Paz, the faithful maid and nanny of Clemente's daughters, and Pascual, the foreman of "La Noria", know the truth of what really happened between Clemente and Servando 28 years ago.

Isabella, the eldest of Clemente's daughters, is her father's pride and joy. She is prideful, and is ruthless in business, just like her father. She loves her father, and believes that her father's new wife, Karina, is only interested in the wealth and power she gains from her marriage.

Isabella becomes engaged to Cesar the horse trainer in the Olympio, however she finds herself attracted to the new veterinarian Victor Izzaguirre. Victor Izaguirre, a well-known veterinarian who is not legally divorced from his estranged wife Consuelo, the mother of his two daughters: Ximena and Pili.

Because Isabella loves Victor, Karina decides to seduce him. Even though Victor loves Isabella very much, he falls in Karina's traps and Isabella, prideful like her father, refuses to hear him out and becomes engaged to Cesar once more. Isabella also has a parallel situation that has to do with her origins.

For her, it is painful to know the truth about her birth and her origin and she feels anger against Paz, her nanny, for having lied to her. In the end, Clemente accepts the truth in front of Isabella. Diana, the shyest of the sisters, returns home with a degree in architecture.

Without knowing her father's rivalry with Octavio Uriarte, she begins to work for his firm. Even after she finds out about the rivalry, she falls in love with Octavio, who used to be her professor when she studied architecture. At first, what separates the couple is the fact that they are from two rival families, and their age difference. The fact that Mauricio, protégé of Octavio, is also in love with Diana, adds up to the other two obstacles.

Even with all of these impediments, Diana gives herself to Octavio's love, but then realizes that the hate between the two families seems unsurmountable. Octavio, disillusioned with Diana, marries Mariana, his old girlfriend. But after so much impediments Diana and Octavio have a baby and end up together and engaged. Carolina, the youngest of the Soriano sisters, returns from her studies in the United States to rekindle her relationship with Rafael, a man who seems only interested in her fortune.

However, she ends up falling in love with Pablo, Paz's son, even though she had rejected and humiliated him because of his status and in the end they also end up engaged. Because he believes his daughters deserve better, Clemente destroys their love lives, and inadvertently distances them from himself. Without intention, Clemente becomes the villain of the story.

He receives what he deserves when his marriage is destroyed. He becomes isolated and rejected by his daughters, who are his most prized treasure. However, he recognizes all the errors he has made, accepts his daughters' lifestyle and romantic decisions and obtains forgiveness from them.

Cast

Main
Sergio Goyri as Victor Izaguirre
Karyme Lozano as Isabela Soriano Rivera
Eric del Castillo as Clemente Soriano
Otto Sirgo as Octavio Uriarte
Roberto Ballesteros as Melchor Arrieta
Mayrín Villanueva as Diana Soriano Rivera
Ludwika Paleta as Carolina Soriano Rivera
Mercedes Molto as Karina Sánchez de Soriano
Antonio Medellín as Pascual Criollo
Emilia Carranza as Socorro de Uriarte
Isaura Espinoza as Paz Guzmán de Criollo
Mariagna Prats as Painter Mariagna Prats
Luis Gatica as Jorge Esparza
Juan Pablo Gamboa as César Fábregas / Armando Sánchez
Eugenia Cauduro as Julia Moreno
Patricia Martínez as Trinidad "Trini" Osuna
Polly as Lic. Ima Ibáñez
Oscar Traven as Oscar Alvarado
Roberto Palazuelos as Rafael Rincón del Valle Alcázar
Julio Mannino as Pablo Guzmán
Jan as Mauricio Barocio
Cecilia Gabriela as Consuelo Mendiola de Izaguirre
Norma Lazareno as Judith Alcázar de Rincón del Valle
Arlette Pacheco as Zulema Contreras
Myrrah Saavedra as Gloria de Arrieta
Rafael Amador as Agent Gustavo Pérez
Sergio Sánchez as Agent Héctor Ibarra
Rafael del Villar as Pedro Landeta
Ricardo Vera as Arizmendi
Jorge de Silva as Ringo
Giovan D'Angelo as Edgar Toledo
Yuliana Peniche as Luz Arrieta
Oscar Ferreti as Horacio Rivero

Recurring and guest stars
Socorro Bonilla as Casilda de Criollo
Roberto D'Amico as Lic. Juan Hurtado
Fernando Robles as Mr. Robles
Janina Hidalgo as Ángeles
Bibelot Mansur as Sofía "Chofi" Juárez Peña de Landeta
Citalli Galindo as Dr. Susana Iturbide de Esparza
Raúl Magaña as Danilo Duarte
José Antonio Ferral as Pedro
Ramiro Torres as Ignacio "Nacho" Fábregas Moreno
María Fernanda Rodríguez as Ximena Izaguirre Mendiola
Marijose Valverde as Pilar "Pili" Izaguirre Mendiola
Lucía Leyba as Beatriz "Betty"
Isaac Castro as José "Pepe" Mejía
Víctor Luis Zúñiga as Juanito
Víctor Noriega as Servando Uriarte
Marisol Santacruz as Isabela Lucía Rivera Vda. de Uriarte/de Soriano
Fidel Zerda as Santos
Rubén Morales as Teniente Manuel Arroyo
Jorge Pascual Rubio as Teniente Luis Ochoa
Florencia Ferret as Gladys

Awards and nominations

References

External links

 at esmas.com 

2003 telenovelas
Mexican telenovelas
2003 Mexican television series debuts
2003 Mexican television series endings
Television shows set in Mexico
Televisa telenovelas
Mexican television series based on Venezuelan television series
Spanish-language telenovelas